Rhinophis tricoloratus is a species of snake in the family Uropeltidae. It is endemic to Sri Lanka.

References

Further reading
 Deraniyagala, P.E.P. 1975. A new fossorial snake of the genus Rhinophis Hemprich. Spolia Zeylanica 33 (1-2): 535–536.

tricoloratus
Snakes of Asia
Reptiles of Sri Lanka
Endemic fauna of Sri Lanka
Reptiles described in 1975
Taxa named by Paulus Edward Pieris Deraniyagala